Kızılçukur can refer to the following villages in Turkey:

 Kızılçukur, Bigadiç
 Kızılçukur, Dikili
 Kızılçukur, Tarsus